is a manga artist from Kōchi City, Japan. He is best known for his numerous manga adaptations of the popular fighting game series Street Fighter. Two of Nakahira's original concepts for his Street Fighter manga, the character of Evil Ryu (Ryu's possession by the ) and Karin Kanzuki (Sakura Kasugano's rival) were adapted into later video games.

Works 
 Gakuen Teikoku Ore wa Juubei! (1993)
 Super Street Fighter II - Cammy Gaiden (1994)
 Street Fighter Alpha (1996)
 Street Fighter: Sakura Ganbaru! (1996)
 Street Fighter III - Ryu Final (1997)
 Sadamitsu the Destroyer (1999)
 Dream Buster (2007)
 Tsuki Robo (2010)
 Akai Kemono (2014)

Notes and references

Living people
Manga artists from Kōchi Prefecture
People from Kōchi, Kōchi
Year of birth missing (living people)